The 36th Wisconsin Infantry Regiment was a volunteer infantry regiment that served in the Union Army during the American Civil War.  Their entire service was spent in II Corps, with the Army of the Potomac in the eastern theater of the war.

Service
The 36th Wisconsin was organized at Camp Randall in Madison, Wisconsin, and mustered into federal service on March 23, 1864.  

The regiment was mustered out on July 12, 1865.

Casualties
The 36th Wisconsin suffered 7 officers and 150 enlisted men killed or fatally wounded in action and 3 officers and 182 enlisted men who died of disease, for a total of 342 fatalities.

Commanders

 Colonel Frank A. Haskell (March 23, 1864June 3, 1864) — Killed in action at the Battle of Cold Harbor, previously served in the 6th Wisconsin Infantry Regiment.
 Colonel John A. Savage Jr. (June 3, 1864June 18, 1864) — Killed in action at the Second Battle of Petersburg.
 Colonel Harvey M. Brown (June 18, 1864October 27, 1864) — Wounded at the Second Battle of Petersburg at the same place Colonel Savage was killed, only held nominal command of the regiment.
 Colonel Clement Warner (October 27, 1864July 12, 1865) — Entered service as captain of Co. B, wounded at Second Battle of Deep Bottom, lost an arm, but returned to command the regiment through the end of the war.
 Captain Austin Cannon was in operational command of the regiment from the time of Colonel Warner's injury on August 14, 1864, until the return of Captain George A. Fisk, who was senior captain.
 Captain George A. Fisk was in operation command of the regiment from September 1864 until Colonel Warner returned to active duty in December 1864.

Notable people
 John W. Thomas was a private in Co. K.  He later became a Wisconsin state senator and the 8th Wisconsin railroad commissioner.
 George Weeks served as first lieutenant of Co. B., promoted to captain after the war, later became a politician.

See also

 List of Wisconsin Civil War units
 Wisconsin in the American Civil War

References
The Civil War Archive

Military units and formations established in 1864
Military units and formations disestablished in 1865
Units and formations of the Union Army from Wisconsin
1864 establishments in Wisconsin